Amnour is a Block in Saran District of Bihar State, India. Amnour Block Headquarters is Amnour town. It belongs to Saran Division. It is located 32 km towards North from District headquarters Chhapra. And 52 km from State capital Patna towards South. The
Amnour Block is bounded by the Marhaurah Block towards west, Isuapur Block towards west, Maker Block towards East, Taraiya Block towards North. Marhaura City, Dighwara City, Lalganj City, Lalganj City are the nearby Cities to Amnour.
Amnour consist of 19 Villages and 19 Panchayats. Arna, Chak is the smallest Village and Amnaur Harnaraen is the biggest Village. It is in the 57 meter elevation (altitude). This Place is in the border of the Saran District and Vaishali District.

Demographics

Amnour Block Bhojpuri is the Local Language here. Also People Speaks Hindi and Urdu. The 2011 census report to the total population of Amnour Block is 168,339 living in 24,643 Houses, Spread across total 19 villages and 19 panchayats. Males are 86,326 and Females are 82,013. Amnour sultan, popularly known as Gosi Amnour, is a very famous village in area.

Weather and climate
It is hot in summer. Amnour's summer highest day temperature is between 25.8 °C to 42 °C.
Average temperatures of January is 12.5 °C, February is 19 °C, March is 26 °C, April is 30.3 °C, May is 33 °C.

Transportation and connectivity

Rail

Marhaura Railway Station, Terha Halt Railway Station are the very nearby railway stations to Amnour Block. Chhapra Kacheri Railway Station (near to Chhapra), Marhaura Railway Station (near to Marhaura), Chhapra Railway Station (near to Chhapra), Terha Halt Railway Station (near to Marhaura) are the Railway stations reachable from nearby towns.

Road

Marhaura, Chhapra are the nearby by towns to Amnour having road connectivity to Amnour.

References 

Saran district